Daniel Mejías Hurtado (26 July 1982 – 8 November 2022) was an Andorran footballer who played as a midfielder. He made five appearances for the Andorra national team, having made his international debut in 2010.

Mejías died on 8 November 2022, aged 40.

References

External links

FAF profile

1982 births
2022 deaths
Footballers from Barcelona
Andorran footballers
Spanish footballers
Association football midfielders
Andorra international footballers
Segunda División B players
Tercera División players
FC Barcelona C players
Sporting de Gijón B players
CD Villanueva players
CF Peralada players
Moralo CP players
UE Sant Julià players
FC Andorra players
FC Ordino players
FC Lusitanos players
Inter Club d'Escaldes players